Sociedade Esportiva, Recreativa e Cultural Guarani, commonly known as Guarani de Palhoça, or simply as Guarani, is a Brazilian football club based in Palhoça, Santa Catarina state.

History
The club was founded on February 15, 1928, as Guarani Futebol Clube, and professionalized in 2000. The club was renamed to its current name, Sociedade Esportiva, Recreativa e Cultural Guarani in 2003. They won the Campeonato Catarinense Second Level in 2003. The club will play in the Second Division of the Santa Catarina State Championship in 2014.

Achievements
 Campeonato Catarinense Second Level:
 Winners (1): 2003

Stadium
Sociedade Esportiva, Recreativa e Cultural Guarani play their home games at Estádio Renato Silveira. The stadium has a maximum capacity of 3,000 people.

References

Association football clubs established in 1928
Football clubs in Santa Catarina (state)
1928 establishments in Brazil